Carolina Lozado (born May 7, 1971) is a Uruguayan pistol shooter. At age thirty-seven, Lozado made her official debut for the 2008 Summer Olympics in Beijing, where she competed in the women's 10 m air pistol shooting. She finished only in forty-third place for the qualifying rounds, with a total score of 367 points.

References

External links
NBC Olympics Profile

Uruguayan female sport shooters
Living people
Olympic shooters of Uruguay
Shooters at the 2008 Summer Olympics
1971 births